Center Valley is an unincorporated community located one mile north of Coopersburg, at the intersection of Pennsylvania State Routes 309 and 378 in Upper Saucon Township in Lehigh County, Pennsylvania. It is part of the Lehigh Valley, which had a population of 861,899 and was the 68th most populous metropolitan area in the U.S. as of the 2020 census.

History
Centennial Bridge in Center Valley, built in 1876, was listed on the National Register of Historic Places in 1989. The bridge was demolished in 2013.

Commerce and businesses
Stabler Corporate Center, one of the largest areas of land being developed in the Lehigh Valley, is located in Center Valley. In October 2006, The Promenade Shops at Saucon Valley, the Lehigh Valley's highest-end outdoor mall, opened in Center Valley.

Center Valley also is headquarters of Olympus Corporation for the Americas, JetPay, Aesculap (a subsidiary of B. Braun), and the Patriot League, a college athletic conference with 24 men's and women's collegiate sports. The city also holds large regional offices for Dun & Bradstreet and Mass Mutual.

Education

Primary and secondary education
Center Valley is part of the Southern Lehigh School District. Students in grade nine through 12 attend Southern Lehigh High School in Center Valley.

Colleges and universities
Two campuses of higher education are located in Center Valley:
DeSales University, formerly Allentown College of St. Francis de Sales
Penn State Lehigh Valley

Notable people
Ed Freed, former professional baseball player, Philadelphia Phillies
Beatrice Kemmerer, former All-American Girls Professional Baseball League player

References

Unincorporated communities in Lehigh County, Pennsylvania
Unincorporated communities in Pennsylvania